Émilie Loit was the defending champion, but lost to Nuria Llagostera Vives in the semifinals.

Llagostera Vives went on to win the title, defeating Zheng Jie 6–4, 6–2 in the final.

Seeds

Draw

Finals

Section 1

Section 2

References

2005 WTA Tour
Morocco Open
2005 in Moroccan tennis